Charuvi Design Labs (CDL) is an animation studio and design lab based in New Delhi, India. CDL was founded in 2009 by artist Charuvi Agrawal.

CDL designs, animates, directs, and produces digital art works, including pre-visualization and conceptual artwork, 3D and 2D animation, digital media, Television Commercial, application and game designs, interactive physical media installations, augmented reality, and IP creation.

Films 
CDL produced the 3D animated short film Shri Hanuman Chalisa in 2013. and made a  sculpture of Hanuman, made of 26,500 bells and installed in a mall in Delhi's Select CityWalk. In front of the installation were kept a pair of Khadau (traditional Indian footwear), touching which would make all the 26,500 bells ring simultaneously. CDL also known for its artwork Kaavad (16-feet story book), Figurines of Lord Hanuman and Asuras.

Charuvi Design Labs also contributed 20 minutes of visual effects for the live action feature film Jaanisaar in 2015, a film directed by Muzaffar Ali.

Charuvi Design Labs worked with Turner (Cartoon Network), International Committee of Red Cross, The Energy and Resources Institute (TERI), National Film Board of Canada, DDB Mudra, Godrej, Select Citywalk, Liberty, Nestle, Riva Digital, Deutsche Gesellschaft für Internationale Zusammenarbeit (GIZ) GmbH, Asian Paints and private museums.

The Legend of Hanuman - Animated Web Series

An Animated Series "The Legend of Hanuman" produced by Graphic India and created by Sharad Devarajan, Charuvi Agrawal and Jeevan J. Kang. The series is a combined effort of artists from Graphic India, Charuvi Agrawal (CDL) and Redefine. The series is scheduled to premiere on Disney+ Hotstar globally on January 29, 2021 in seven Indian languages. The animated web series will feature Lord Hanuman's extraordinary journey of self-discovery. It is Narrated by Sharad Kelkar.

The trailer of this animated web series is out on Disney Hotstar in Hindi, Tamil and Telugu Language.

The series follows Hanuman and his transformation from a mighty warrior to a god and how Hanuman became the beacon of hope amidst the harrowing darkness.

All 13 episodes of the show are available in 7 languages – Hindi, Tamil, Telugu, Marathi, Bengali, Malayalam, and Kannada; and were exclusively released on Disney+ Hotstar VIP. At the time, the show was the most watched animated show on any OTT platform. Source Cartoon Brew.

References 

Companies based in New Delhi
Indian animation studios
Indian companies established in 2009
Visual effects companies
Film production companies of Delhi